Russian Beauty is a novel written by Russian author Victor Erofeyev.

Publication
Russian Beauty was released in Russia in 1990, and then translated into more than 20 languages.  It was published in France under the name « La Belle de Moscou » ("Moscow Beauty") in 1991, and in English one year later.

Summary
Beautiful and utterly perfect Irina Tarakanova relates the story of the erotic odyssey that takes her from a passionate adventure with the father of her unborn child to caring lesbian affairs with her best friend.
She tells the story of her life, mostly about her sexuality and erotic actions in a very excessive way.

Reception
In 1992, the British newspaper The Independent called Erofeyev "the exuberant new iconoclast of Russian literature." Noting the novel's sexual frankness, the paper added, "Victor Erofeyev's book, Russian Beauty, gives new impact to the phrase 'the Russians are coming'."

In other media
The novel was filmed by an Italian producer but was considered by the author as "unsuccessful".

References

External links
Q & A in The Independent with Victor Erofeyev about Russian Beauty

Russian LGBT novels
1990 novels
20th-century Russian novels
1990s LGBT novels